Carl Sven-Göran Ljunggren (28 January 1949, Arlöv – 18 January 1985), known by his stage name Kal P. Dal, was a rock musician from Arlöv in Scania (in Sweden). His most famous hit was the song "Blåa Sko'" ("Blue Shoes" in the Scanian dialect). Other hits were "Jonnie", "Bara Rock 'N' Roll" (a Scanian version of "It's Only Rock 'n' Roll), "Raka rör" and "Om ja' va' en slashas/Jag vill leva fri" (a version of "If I Were a Carpenter"). His debut album "Till Mossan!" ("To Mom!") peaked at number 7 on the Swedish album charts where it stayed for 14 weeks.

Career
He played at concerts at Akademiska Föreningen (The Academic Society) in Lund. It was there he met fellow Scanian and musician Peps Persson who convinced Sonet Records to release his music. His debut album "Till Mossan!" ("To Mom!", 1977) peaked at number 7 on the Swedish album charts where it stayed for 14 weeks. Later albums also charted, but didn't reach the same success.

He also had a small part in the film Barnförbjudet (1979)

Death and legacy

He died on January 18, 1985, ten days before his 36th birthday. The death was caused by cerebral haemorrhage.

After his death he got one of the local Pågatåg trains named after him. All of the Pågatåg trains are named after famous people from Scania. In 2005 he also got a street in his home town Arlöv named after him. It was originally suggested that he would get a statue instead, and there is a Facebook group with thousands of members dedicated to making the statue a reality.

Pascal, a rock band from Gotland, Sweden, made a cover of the song "Jonnie". The well-known Swedish indie rock band Bob Hund have cited Kal P. Dal as an inspiration.

Covers (with new Swedish lyrics)
"Bara rock 'n' roll" (The Rolling Stones' "It's Only Rock 'n' Roll (But I Like It)")
"Brunt socker" (The Rolling Stones' "Brown Sugar")
"Du bara bankar" (Little Richard's "Keep A-Knockin'")
"Houndans kvinna II" (The Rolling Stones' "Honky Tonk Women")
"Ja' kan li en regnig kväll" (Eddie Rabbitt's "I Love a Rainy Night")
"Jenny Jenny" (Eddie Cochran's "Jeanie, Jeanie, Jeanie")
"John Silver" (Chuck Berry's "Johnny B. Goode")
"Jonnie" (10cc's "Johnny, Don't Do It")
"Kaddilack" (Vince Taylor's "Brand New Cadillac")
"Karolin" (Status Quo's "Caroline")
"Knabbar på himelens dörr" (Bob Dylan's "Knockin' on Heaven's Door")
"Kungens knall" (Bachman-Turner Overdrive's "You Ain't Seen Nothing Yet")
"Om ja' va' en slashas / Jag vill leva fri" (Tim Hardin's "If I Were a Carpenter")
"Rock påg" (Thin Lizzy's "The Rocker")
"Rosalie, Rosalie" (Bob Seger's "Rosalie")
"Skit i maj" (Rory Gallagher's "Shadow Play")
"Starta mej" (The Rolling Stones' "Start Me Up")
"Tutti-Frutti" (Little Richard's "Tutti-Frutti")
"Ålrajt / Rocka maj" (Free's "All Right Now")

Notes

External links
 http://www.kalpdal.se 
 Kal P Dal – lika populära i dag som på 70-talet, article in Skånska Dagbladet focusing on a new book released about the artist 

1949 births
1985 deaths
People from Burlöv Municipality
20th-century Swedish male musicians